The 1980 Spanish motorcycle Grand Prix was the second round of the 1980 Grand Prix motorcycle racing season. It took place on the weekend of 16–18 May 1980 at the Circuito Permanente del Jarama.

Classification

500 cc

References

Spanish motorcycle Grand Prix
Spanish
May 1980 sports events in Europe